Lockhart is a city and the county seat of Caldwell County, Texas, United States. According to the 2020 census, its population was 14,379.

History

The city of Lockhart is named after Byrd Lockhart, an assistant surveyor of Green DeWitt and reportedly the first Anglo to set foot in Caldwell County. Lockhart was the site of a victory of the Texans over the Comanche, at the Battle of Plum Creek in 1840. Lockhart was originally called "Plum Creek", but the name was later changed to Lockhart.

The town's economic growth began with the arrival of the railroad in the late 19th century, when the town became a regional shipping center for local cotton. Following the arrival of the railroad, immigrants arrived in Lockhart and opened various businesses.

Lockhart has several claims to fame. In 1999, the Texas Legislature proclaimed Lockhart the "Barbecue Capital of Texas"; Lockhart has four major barbecue restaurants. The Dr. Eugene Clark Library is the oldest operating public library in Texas. Lockhart was also the subject of an article by the architectural historian and critic Colin Rowe and architect John Hejduk, first published in Architectural Record in 1957 and republished in the collection of his writings As I Was Saying (1996). Rowe and Hejduk see Lockhart as a "curiously eloquent" example of a Victorian post-frontier American town.

The 1996 Christopher Guest comedy film Waiting for Guffman and the 1993 drama What's Eating Gilbert Grape were filmed partly in Lockhart, including the historic courthouse and the town square. The city's Walmart store was featured in the 2000 film Where the Heart Is.

On July 30, 2016, a hot air balloon struck a power line and caught on fire, killing all 16 people on board when it crashed near the unincorporated community of Maxwell.

Geography

Lockhart is located at  (29.881870, –97.676040).

Climate

Climate is characterized by relatively high temperatures and evenly distributed precipitation throughout the year.  The Köppen climate classification subtype for this climate is humid subtropical climate, Cfa.

Demographics

As of the 2020 United States census, there were 14,379 people, 4,503 households, and 2,944 families residing in the city.

As of the census of 2000, 11,615 people, 3,627 households, and 2,691 families were residing in the city. The population density was 1,032.7 people per sq mi (398.6/km). The 3,871 housing units averaged 344.2 per sq mi (132.9/km). The racial makeup of the city was 65.42% White, 12.68% African American, 0.67% Native American, 0.34% Asian, 0.06% Pacific Islander, 18.00% from other races, and 2.82% from two or more races. Hispanics or Latinos of any race were 47.41% of the population.

Of the 3,627 households, 38.0% had children under the age of 18 living with them, 52.0% were married couples living together, 16.6% had a female householder with no husband present, and 25.8% were not families. About 21.9% of all households were made up of individuals, and 10.6% had someone living alone who was 65 years of age or older. The average household size was 2.81, and the average family size was 3.28.

In the city, the age distribution was 26.5% under the age of 18, 9.2% from 18 to 24, 32.1% from 25 to 44, 18.9% from 45 to 64, and 13.2% who were 65 years of age or older. The median age was 34 years. For every 100 females, there were 93.0 males. For every 100 females age 18 and over, there were 89.4 males.

The median income for a household in the city was $36,762, and for a family was $41,111. Males had a median income of $29,329 versus $20,923 for females. The per capita income for the city was $13,621. About 12.2% of families and 14.6% of the population were below the poverty line, including 14.8% of those under age 18 and 18.1% of those age 65 or over.

Government
Lockhart is served by a seven-person city council. The mayor and two council members are elected at large. The remaining four council members are elected from single-member districts.
Mayor – Lew White
City Council At-Large – Angie Gonzales-Sanchez
City Council At-Large – Brad Westmoreland
City Council District 1 – Juan Mendoza
City Council District 2 – David Bryant
City Council District 3 – Kara McGregor
City Council District 4 – Jeffry Michelson

Education
Lockhart is served by the Lockhart Independent School District and is home to the Lockhart High School Lions.

The city has a museum, the Southwest Museum of Clocks and Watches.

Movies shot in Lockhart
The following are some of the films that have been shot in whole or in part in Lockhart:

Significant historic buildings
Dr. Eugene Clark Library, the oldest continuously operating public library in Texas
Caldwell County Courthouse

Notable people

 Scott H. Biram, musician
 Lily Cahill, actress
 John Cyrier, state representative for District 17; Lockhart native
 Willie Ellison, professional football player
 Maud A. B. Fuller, educator, missionary and community leader
 Billy Grabarkewitz, Major League Baseball player
 James McMurtry, musician
 Primo Miller, football player
 Robert Schwarz Strauss, politician and diplomat

Gallery

References

External links

 City of Lockhart official website
 Lockhart Chamber of Commerce

Cities in Texas
Cities in Caldwell County, Texas
County seats in Texas
Cities in Greater Austin